Crowder State Park is a public recreation area of  surrounding  Crowder Lake near Trenton in Grundy County, Missouri, USA. The state park and lake are named after Maj. General Enoch H. Crowder, who was born and raised near the park.

Features
The Crowder State Park Vehicle Bridge, a small single-arch span of reinforced concrete with a facing of cut stone built about 1939, is the only surviving structure erected in the park by the Civilian Conservation Corps. It was listed on the National Register of Historic Places in 1985.

Activities and amenities
The park offers picnicking, camping, fishing, swimming, canoeing, and trails for hiking, cycling and horseback riding.

References

External links
Crowder State Park Missouri Department of Natural Resources
Crowder State Park Map Missouri Department of Natural Resources

Civilian Conservation Corps in Missouri
Bridges on the National Register of Historic Places in Missouri
Bridges completed in 1939
Protected areas of Grundy County, Missouri
State parks of Missouri
Protected areas established in 1938
National Register of Historic Places in Grundy County, Missouri
Arch bridges in the United States
Concrete bridges in the United States
Road bridges in Missouri
Buildings and structures in Grundy County, Missouri